Amol Jungade (born 6 February 1989) is an Indian first-class cricketer who plays for Vidarbha.

References

External links
 

1989 births
Living people
Indian cricketers
Vidarbha cricketers
People from Buldhana district